is a 573.0 metre high Japanese mountain in Takarazuka, Hyōgo, Japan.

Outline 
Mount Iwahara is a part of Setonaikai National Park. The mountain is a peak on the East Ridge of the Rokko Mountains. The mountain is the highest mountain in Takarazuka City.

Access
 Eden no Sono Bus Stop of Hankyu Bus
 Shirubeiwa Bus Stop of Hankyu Bus

References
 Shozo Tamaki, Rokkosan Hakubutsushi, Kobe Shimbun Shuppan Center
 Official Home Page of Setonaikai National Park
 Official Home Page of the Geographical Survey Institute in Japan

Iwahara